Ken Bradshaw (born October 4, 1952) is an American professional surfer and winner of the 1982 Duke Kahanamoku Invitational Surfing Championship.

Bradshaw was born in Houston, Texas. The site was Outside Log Cabins, an outer reef on the North Shore of Oahu, Hawaii. The ride lasted about 30 seconds.

Bradshaw took part in a hypothermia experiment for Discovery Channel which lasted for 4 hours at  without clothing.

Lifestyle
Bradshaw is a vegetarian. He was Layne Beachley's partner, helping her to become one of the world's top female surfers.

References

External links
 

1952 births
American surfers
Big wave surfing
Living people
Mavericks
Sportspeople from Houston
Tow-in surfers